Poorly Formed is the eighth full-length album by Californian punk rock band Swingin' Utters.

Track listing

Personnel
 Johnny Bonnel (vocals)
 Darius Koski (guitar, vocals)
 Jack Dalrymple (guitar, vocals)
 Greg McEntee (drums)
 Miles Peck (bass, vocals)

References

External links
Official Swingin' Utters homepage
[ Swingin' Utters at Allmusic]

Swingin' Utters albums
Fat Wreck Chords albums
2013 albums